XHCK-FM is a radio station in Durango, Durango. It was founded in 1954 by Alejandro Stevenson Torrijos and moved from 620 AM (where its callsign was XECK) to 95.7 FM in the early 2010s.

References

Radio stations in Durango
Mass media in Durango City